Brussels-Chapel railway station, officially Brussels-Chapel, is a railway station on the North–South connection in the City of Brussels, Belgium. Despite its city centre location and the busy passing railway line, few trains stop there nowadays.

The station was opened in 1952, following construction of the North–South connection, between the stations of Brussels-Central and Brussels-South. It is situated in the Marolles/Marollen district, and takes its name from the neighbouring Chapel Church. Also immediately opposite the station is St John Berchmans College.

Train services

The station is served by some trains of the S1 line of the Brussels Regional Express Network (RER/GEN). During the week, one train an hour stops in each direction. There is no service at all later in the evenings or at weekends. The stopping trains generally use platforms 5 and 6, the easternmost pair of tracks.

Recyclart
While few trains stop at the station, the buildings beneath the track level have found an alternative use. The Recyclart project, which started in 1997, is a social-cultural space with an urban, DIY feel. It puts on art exhibitions and concerts, provides workshop space to artists of many varieties, and offers food and drink.

See also

 List of railway stations in Belgium
 Rail transport in Belgium
 Transport in Brussels
 History of Brussels

References

Notes

External links

 Official station details from NMBS/SNCB
 Recyclart

Railway stations in Brussels
Railway stations opened in 1952
City of Brussels